Robert Nietzel Buck (January 29, 1914 – April 14, 2007) broke the junior transcontinental air speed record in 1930 and for a time was the youngest licensed pilot in the United States.

Biography
He was born in Elizabeth, New Jersey on January 29, 1914 to Abijah Orange Buck (1869–1932) and Emily Nietzel. Emily was Abija's second wife, and she was the daughter of Elizabeth Bellingrath.

In 1930 at age 16 he took lessons in a Fleet Aircraft using a Kinner engine. He received the United States Department of Commerce license #13478.

On October 4, 1930 he beat the junior transcontinental airspeed record of Eddie August Schneider in his PA-6 Pitcairn Mailwing he named "Yankee Clipper". His time was 23 hours and 47 minutes of elapsed flying time. The junior record only counts time in the air and excludes time spent on the ground. Robert said on February 6, 2005: "I was the youngest to fly coast to coast and that record still stands. I had my license at 16 and after that, they raised the minimum age to 17. With that change no one could break my record."

Buck married Jean Pearsall in 1938.

In 1937 he began flying for TWA. Buck became a Captain in 1940, then was promoted to TWA's chief pilot in 1945. In September 1957, Buck piloted the first nonstop flight from Los Angeles to London, flying the long-range Lockheed L-1649 Starliner; the following year, he wrote an extensive description of the flight published by Air Facts magazine. 
 
In 1965 he flew around the world from pole to pole in a Boeing 707. This was done with several other pilots in shifts. In 1970 he flew TWA's first Boeing 747 on Flight 800 from New York City to Paris, and in the same year wrote Weather Flying. He retired from TWA at age 60 on January 28, 1974 and moved to Vermont, where he wrote Flying Know-How, Art of Flying, and Pilot's Burden.

He died on April 14, 2007 in Berlin, Vermont after complications from an accidental fall.

Legacy
He was inducted into the Aviation Hall of Fame of New Jersey in 1981.

Bibliography

References

External links

Robert Nietzel Buck at Valley Reporter
Robert Nietzel Buck at Times Argus
Robert Nietzel Buck at Davis-Monthan Airfield Register
Robert Nietzel Buck at AVWeb

1914 births
2007 deaths
Accidental deaths from falls
Accidental deaths in Vermont
Aviators from New Jersey
People from Elizabeth, New Jersey
People from Westfield, New Jersey
American aviation record holders